Xiaozhuang may refer to:

People
 Empress Dowager Xiaozhuang (孝庄文皇后; 1613–1688), concubine of the Qing Dynasty ruler Hong Taiji
 Emperor Xiaozhuang of Northern Wei (北魏孝莊帝; 507–531)

Places
 Xiaozhuang Township, Yanshan County, Hebei (小庄乡)
 Xiaozhuang Township, Chiping County (肖庄乡), in Chiping County, Shandong
 Xiaozhuang Village, Qixia District, Nanjing

Television series
 Xiaozhuang Mishi (孝庄秘史), 2003 television series depicting the early history of the Qing Dynasty